Cielechowizna  is a village in the administrative district of Gmina Mińsk Mazowiecki, within Mińsk County, Masovian Voivodeship, in east-central Poland. It typically has a warm and humid climate.

References

Cielechowizna